Robert Nelson Chamberlain (July 24, 1856 – September 20, 1917) (sometimes spelled Chamberlin) was an American lawyer and Republican  politician who served as Speaker of the New Hampshire House of Representatives, and as an Associate Justice and later as the second Chief Justice of the New Hampshire Superior Court.

Life
Chamberlin was born on July 24, 1856 in Bangor, New York, but moved to Berlin, New Hampshire when he was a child. As an adult, Chamberlain became interested in town and state affairs and became a lawyer, the first lawyer in said town.

Chamberlin became involved with politics, and from 1893 to 1895, he served as the Speaker of the New Hampshire House of Representatives. In 1904, he was appointed as an associate justice of the New Hampshire Superior Court. Chamberlain was appointed as Chief Justice of the New Hampshire Superior Court in 1917 to replace  Robert G. Pike who had died.

Chamberlain died in Boston, Massachusetts on September 19, 1917.

Notes

 

1856 births
1917 deaths
New Hampshire lawyers
New Hampshire state court judges
Speakers of the New Hampshire House of Representatives
Republican Party members of the New Hampshire House of Representatives
People from Bangor, New York
19th-century American judges
19th-century American lawyers